Filip Filipić (born 25 April 1980) is a Serbian rower. He competed in the men's coxless four event at the 2000 Summer Olympics.

References

External links
 

1980 births
Living people
Serbian male rowers
Olympic rowers of Serbia and Montenegro
Rowers at the 2000 Summer Olympics
Sportspeople from Belgrade